John Angell James (6 June 1785 – 1 October 1859), was an English Nonconformist clergyman and writer.

Life
James was born at Blandford Forum.  After seven years' apprenticeship to a linen-draper in Poole, Dorset, he decided to become a preacher, and in 1802 he went to David Bogue's training institution at Gosport in Hampshire.

A year and a half later, on a visit to Birmingham, his preaching was so highly esteemed by the congregation of Carrs Lane Independent chapel that they invited him to exercise his ministry amongst them; he settled there in 1805, and was ordained in May 1806.  For several years his success as a preacher was comparatively small; but he became suddenly popular in about 1814, and began to attract large crowds.

At the same time his religious writings, the best known of which are The Anxious Inquirer and An Earnest Ministry, acquired a wide circulation.

The Anxious Inquirer sold over 500,000 copies in his lifetime and was translated into more than a dozen languages. This was the book which D. Martyn Lloyd-Jones gave to his wife, Bethan, when she was seeking the Lord. The book was also of great help to Charles Haddon Spurgeon.

In his autobiography Spurgeon wrote: "In an early part of my ministry, while but a lad, I was seized with an intense desire to hear Mr. John Angell James; and, though my finances were somewhat meagre, I performed a pilgrimage to Birmingham solely with that object in view. I heard him deliver a week-evening lecture, in his large vestry, on that precious text, "Ye are complete in Him." The savour of that very sweet discourse abides with me to this day, and I shall never read the passage without associating therewith the quiet but earnest utterances of that eminent man of God."

James was a typical Congregational preacher of the early 19th century, massive and elaborate rather than original. His doctrine was a moderate form of Calvinism, as had been that of Edward Williams, one of his predecessors. He published numerous books on practical subjects of the Christian life, including: The Anxious Inquirer, Pastoral Addresses, an Earnest Ministry, A Help to Domestic Happiness, Female Piety, The Christian Father's Present to His Children, The Young Man's Friend and Guide, and The Widow Directed to the Widow's God. Many of these are still available in print and widely used among Conservative and Reformed Christians in the USA (In England he is largely forgotten). He was one of the founders of the Evangelical Alliance and of the Congregational Union of England and Wales. Municipal interests appealed strongly to him, and he was also for many years chairman of Spring Hill College, Birmingham.

He was also an ardent abolitionist, and is portrayed in the huge canvass depicting Thomas Clarkson's opening address at the world's first Anti-Slavery Convention in 1840, in the National Portrait Gallery, London. He was a contemporary of William Wilberforce and Charles Simeon.

John Angell James was keenly involved in all missionary endeavours and a supporter of the London Missionary Society. His name frequently appears in the Evangelical Magazine and Missionary Chronicle. In 1817 it was James who handed Bibles to John Williams (of Erromanga) and Robert Moffat, in the commissioning service which sent them off to their fields of labour. His fellow student at Bogue's Academy, Robert Morrison, gave him a lifelong interest in missionary endeavours in China and he was the main instigator of an effort to send a million New Testaments to China. In the event they raised enough money for two million copies.

In August 1859, at the ceremony for the laying of the foundation stone of The Metropolitan Tabernacle, Charles Haddon Spurgeon said, "Especially must I mention the name of that honoured father of all the Dissenting churches, the Rev. John Angell James, of Birmingham. There is no name I think just now that ought to be more venerated than his. We frequently exchange notes. I had a sweet letter from that eminent servant of God, in reply to one I had written asking him to come to this meeting. He said, 'I would have done so if I had been well enough, but I am unable to travel. My work is almost done, I cannot serve my Master much longer, but I can still do a little for Him. I preach perhaps once on the Sabbath, and I still continue to do what I can with my pen. What a mercy,' he adds 'to have been permitted to serve my Master so long.' I had written to him sometime before expressing my candid opinion concerning him, and my hearty respect; and he told me that I was mistaken in him. I am quite sure that I was not. I know that I could not think too highly of him." John Angell James died less than two months later, at his home in Birmingham, on 1 October 1859. By special permission of the Home Secretary he was permitted to be interred in a vault beneath his pulpit in Carr's Lane Chapel, as had long been his wish. On 15 June 1970, when Carrs Lane Church was being rebuilt, the coffins of John Angell James and his second wife were disinterred and reburied at Witton Cemetery, Birmingham, in an unmarked common grave (Grave No. 147, Section 15). 

John Angell James's brother, Thomas (1789-1873), also became a pastor, based in London. His brother James was a deacon at Carrs Lane Chapel. His sister Harriet married Rev. Richard Keynes who became pastor of the Congregational church in Salisbury Street, Blandford Forum, where John Angell James had attended as a child.

Works

 The Sunday School Teachers' Guide, 1816
 Christian Fellowship, or the Church Members' Guide, 1822
 The Christian Father's Present to his Children, 1824
 Christian Charity Explained, 1828
 The Family Monitor, or a Help to Domestic Happiness, 1828
 The Anxious Inquirer after Salvation Directed and Encouraged, 1834 (Reprinted by Quinta Press, 2003)
 "The Christian Professor, 1837
 The Young Man from Home, 1838
 Pastoral Addresses, first series, 1840
 Pastoral Addresses, second series, 1841
 The Widow Directed to the Widow's God, 1841
 Pastoral Addresses, third series, 1842
 An Earnest Ministry the Want of the Times, 1847 (reprinted by Banner of Truth Trust, 1993)
 The Church in Earnest, 1848
 The Young Man's Friend and Guide through Life to Immortality, 1851
 Female Piety, or the Young Woman's Guide through Life to Immortality, 1852
 The Course of Faith, or the Practical Believer Delineated, 1852
 Christian Progress, 1853
 Christian Hope, 1858
 The Works of John Angell James (17 volumes), Hamilton Adams, 1860–64

Biographical Works about John Angell James:
 John Angell James: A Review of his History, Character, Eloquence, and Literary Labours, by John Campbell, 1860 (pp. 256). 
 The Life and Letters of John Angell James, by R.W. Dale, 1861 (pp. 633).
 The Autobiography of John Angell James (with addition by his son), by T.S. James, 1864 (in Vol.XVII of The Works, pp. 545).  
 John Angell James (A Heritage Biography), by C.A. Haig, 1961 (pp. 23).

Family
James married, firstly, to Frances Charlotte Smith (born 1783), on 7 July 1806. Frances, a physician's daughter of independent fortune, resided in Hagley Road, Birmingham, where their family would live. They had four children:
 Stillborn (1807) 
 Thomas Smith James (1809-1874) -- see below
 Daughter (1810-1811)
 Sarah Ann James (1814-1882)

Frances died 27 January 1819. Her widower remarried, to Anna Maria Neale on 19 February 1822. Anna was the widow of Benjamin Neale (whom she had married in 1812). She had no children.

Thomas Smith James
Thomas Smith James (1809–1874) was a solicitor in Birmingham. He edited his father's works (Published in 17 volumes, 1860–64, by Hamilton Adams) in which he also defended his father's view of justification against criticisms made by his co-pastor and successor, R.W.Dale, who published The Life and Letters of John Angell James in 1861. (See Volume XVII of The Works of John Angell James, containing the Autobiography of John Angell James with additions by his son).

Thomas Smith James also published The History of the Litigation and Legislation respecting Presbyterian Chapels and Charities in England and Ireland &c., 1867. Part of this work was earlier issued as Lists and Classifications of Presbyterian and Independent Ministers, 1717–31, &c., 1866, an 'Addendum' [1868] dealt with the criticisms of John Gordon. The work was inaccurate; it did contain "Dr. Evans's List" (1715–1729). His first wife died within weeks of marriage. He married a second time and had two daughters. He died on 3 February 1874.

References

External links

 - Chronological listing of the writings of John Angell James taken from volume 17 of his works

Attribution

1785 births
1859 deaths
English abolitionists
People from Blandford Forum
James, John
English Congregationalist ministers
Congregationalist abolitionists